The Gerald Loeb Award is given annually for multiple categories of business reporting. The "Feature Writing" category was awarded in 2008–2010 for articles with an emphasis on craft and style, including profiles and explanatory articles in both print and online media. The "Feature" category replaced the "Magazine" and "Large Newspaper" categories beginning in 2015, and were awarded for pieces showing exemplary craft and style in any medium that explain or enlighten business topics.

Gerald Loeb Award winners for Feature Writing (2007–2010)

 2007: "Rewriting the Social Contract" by Louis Uchitelle, The New York Times

Article in Series:
"At 150 Edgars Lane, Changing the Idea of Home", January 2, 2006
"Two Tiers, Slipping Into One", February 26, 2006
"Men Not Working, and Not Wanting Just Any Job", July 31, 2006
"Very Rich Are Leaving the Merely Rich Behind", November 27, 2006

 2008: Charles Fishman, Fast Company

Article:
"Message in a Bottle", July 1, 2007

 2009: Michael Lewis, Condé Nast Portfolio

Article:
"The End", December 8, 2008

 2010: Michael Lewis, Vanity Fair

Article:
"Wall Street on the Tundra", April 2009

Gerald Loeb Award winners for Feature (2015–present)

 2015: "California Goes Nuts" by Tom Philpott and Matt Black, Mother Jones

Article:
"Invasion of the Hedge Fund Almonds", November/December 2014

 2016: "The Unraveling of Tom Hayes" by David Enrich, The Wall Street Journal

Articles in Series:
"Rain Man in Trouble", September 13, 2015
"The Gambler", September 14, 2015
"The U-Turn", September 15, 2015
"The Waiting Game", September 16, 2015
"The Trial", September 17, 2015

 2017: Matthew Campbell and Kit Chellel, Bloomberg Businessweek

Article:
"Hot Mess: How Goldman Lost Libya's Money", September 29, 2016

 2018: "Stickin' with the Pig: A Tale of Loyalty and Loss" by Tony Bartelme, The Post and Courier

Articles in series:
"Stickin' with The Pig: A tale of loyalty and loss", June 22, 2017
"In the workers' words", June 22, 2017
"The rise and fall of Piggly Wiggly Carolina", June 22, 2017
"Employee ownership", June 22, 2017
"The lawsuit", June 22, 2017

 2019: James B. Stewart, Rachel Abrams and Ellen Gabler, The New York Times

Article:
"'If Bobbie Talks, I'm Finished': How Les Moonves Tried to Silence an Accuser", November 28, 2018

 2020: "Planet Fox" by Jonathan Mahler and Jim Rutenberg, The New York Times

Articles in series:
"Part 1: Imperial Reach", April 3, 2019
"Part 2: Internal Divisions", April 3, 2019
"Part 3: The New Fox Weapon", April 3, 2019

 2021: "The Recession's Reach in Florida" by Greg Jaffe, The Washington Post

Article:
"A pandemic, a motel without power and a potentially terrifying glimpse of Orlando’s future", September 10, 2020

 2022: "Revolt of the Delivery Workers" by Josh Dzieza, New York Magazine and The Verge

Article:
"Revolt of the delivery workers", September 13, 2021

References

External links
 Gerald Loeb Award historical winners list

 
American journalism awards
Gerald Loeb Award winners